Two Parts Viper is the second full-length studio album by '68. The album was released on June 2, 2017.

Background and composition 
Vocalist and songwriter Josh Scogin said that the album "is a journey […] meant to be heard as a full statement from Track 1 to Track 10," and that the work is to be taken as a "package—the art, the music, the journey it took to get finished, the songs I deleted, the ones I kept, the struggles and the victories... It all had to happen just the way it did or this album would not exist the way it does."

On the album's title, Scogin said "I was in Australia last year and had a dream where a man in a nice suit and tie came up to me. I would fail if I wasn't two parts viper. The dream was terrifyingly parallel with my mental state and conflict at the time. Even the phrase he used in the dream, 'Two Parts Viper,' shared two different meanings as the dream progressed... it struck me as interesting, and so I used it for the title."

Reception 
Two Parts Viper has received critical acclaim from contemporary music critics. On review aggregator website, Metacritic, Two Parts Viper has an aggregate score of 92 out of 100 indicating "universal acclaim".

Ear To The Ground Music described Two Parts Viper as "...a great follow-up record that matches the quality of 68's first, In Humor and Sadness... a hard rock party...a unique record that is difficult to categorize – like The Chariot with more jams, less distorted guitars, and a more relaxed feel."

Lucy Binetti of Paste wrote that Two Parts Viper "...takes the listener on a thrilling musical excursion from start to finish."

Track listing 

Deluxe Edition

Charts

References 

2017 albums
'68 (band) albums